Corbin is an unincorporated community in Sumner County, Kansas, United States.  It is located about 6.5 miles northeast of Caldwell near the intersection of S Mayfield Rd and W 110th St S, next to the railroad.

History
In 1887, the Chicago, Kansas and Nebraska Railway built a branch line north–south from Herington through Corbin to Caldwell.  It foreclosed in 1891 and was taken over by Chicago, Rock Island and Pacific Railway, which shut down in 1980 and reorganized as Oklahoma, Kansas and Texas Railroad, merged in 1988 with Missouri Pacific Railroad, merged in 1997 with Union Pacific Railroad.  Most locals still refer to this railroad as the "Rock Island".

The post office was established February 6, 1884, and discontinued February 16, 1975.  The nearby Spring Creek School is on the National Register of Historic Places.

Education
The community is served by Caldwell USD 360 public school district.

References

Further reading

External links
 Corbin history
 Sumner County map, KDOT

Unincorporated communities in Sumner County, Kansas
Unincorporated communities in Kansas
Wichita, KS Metropolitan Statistical Area